Hamza Ali Abbasi (Urdu/; born 23 June 1984) is a Pakistani  film and television actor and director.

He is known for his roles as Afzal in the drama serial Pyarey Afzal, and as Salahuddin in the drama serial Mann Mayal.  

In 2013, he appeared in two feature films, Main Hoon Shahid Afridi and Waar, for which he received the Best Star Debut Male and Best Supporting Actor awards at the 1st ARY Film Awards.

Family
Abbasi was born into a Punjabi family of civil servants to Major (Retd) Mazhar Ali Abbasi, an army officer, and Begum Nasim Akhtar Chaudhry, a politician affiliated with the Pakistan Peoples Party.

Education
He gained his Bachelor's in International Relations from the United States and his Master's in the same subject from the Quaid-e-Azam University.

He also passed the CSS exams and was working as a civil service officer in the police group before abandoning the job to concentrate on his passions, film-making and acting.

Career
He started his career in 2006 as a theatre actor and appeared in several plays such as Bombay Dreams, Phantom of the Opera, and Home is Where Your Clothes Are. He made his directorial debut with the feature film Mud House and the Golden Doll, which he describes as a simple story about simple people. 

His breakthrough was the movie Waar (2013). He was initially an assistant director to Bilal Lashari, before the later offered him a role in the movie, that he considers important for his future career. 

He voiced Baba Bandook, the main antagonist, and Vadero Pajero in the Unicorn Black produced animated series, Burka Avenger.

Politics
He supports the political party Pakistan Tehreek-e-Insaf, of which he was elected the cultural secretary in January 2018 before quitting the function in April of the same year because he didn't feel "to represent Pakistan’s culture" through his movies.

In 2018 he exposed journalist and former wife of Imran Khan, Reham Khan, by revealing the manuscript of the book beforehand. She also claimed to have been threatened directly by Hamza Ali Abbasi via emails. When Abbasi denied the claim, Khan further stated that it was gimmick of Reham Khan's to malign him because of his closeness to Imran Khan.

Personal life 
Abbasi was born a Muslim, then for a while became an atheist but now identifies as Muslim again.

Theatre

Filmography

Film

References

External links
 

Living people
Pakistani actor-politicians
Pakistani male film actors
Pakistani male voice actors
Pakistani male stage actors
21st-century Pakistani male actors
Pakistani Muslims
Pakistani Sunni Muslims
21st-century Muslims
Punjabi people
BOL Network people
1984 births
Quaid-i-Azam University alumni
Male actors in Urdu cinema
Converts to Islam from atheism or agnosticism
Former atheists and agnostics